Zouk is a musical movement pioneered by the French Antillean band Kassav' in the early 1980s. It was originally characterized by a fast tempo (120–145 bpm), a percussion-driven rhythm and a loud horn section. The fast zouk béton of Martinique and Guadeloupe faded away during the 1980s. Musicians from Martinique and Guadeloupe added MIDI instrumentation to their compas style, which developed into zouk-love. Zouk-love is effectively the French Lesser Antilles' compas. Zouk gradually became indistinguishable from the genre known as compas. This light compas influenced the Cape-Verdean new generation.

Zouk béton 
The original fast carnival style of zouk, best represented by the band Kassav', became known as "zouk béton", "zouk chiré" or "zouk hard". Zouk béton is considered a synthesis of various French Antillean dance music styles of the 20th century: kadans (cadence), konpa and biguine.

See also 

 Brazilian Zouk
 Music of Latin America
 Music of Martinique and Guadeloupe

References 

 
Caribbean music genres
Martinican music
Guadeloupean music
Haitian music
Dominica music
Lesser Antillean music